Samoylov, Samoilov or Samoilovs (Latvian transliteration) is a Russian masculine surname, its feminine counterpart is Samoylova Samoilova. It may refer to

Alexander Samoylov (1744–1814), a Russian general and statesman
Alexander Filippovich Samoylov (1867-1930), Russian pioneer of electrocardiography
Aleksandrs Samoilovs (born 1985), Latvian beach volleyball player
Anton Samoylov (born 1983), Russian football player
David Samoylov (1920–1990), Soviet poet
 Dmitri Samoylov (footballer, born 1990), Russian football player
 Dmitri Samoylov (footballer, born 1993), Russian football player
Konkordiya Samoilova (1876–1921), Russian bolshevik
Maksim Samoylov (born 1981), Russian football player
Oksana Samoylova (born 1988), Russian model
Pavel Samoylov (born 1982), Russian football player
Tatiana Samoylova (1934–2014), Russian and Soviet actress
Vadim and Gleb Samoylov, leaders of the Russian rock band Agatha Christie (band) 
Vasily Samoylov (1813–1887), Russian actor
Vitali Samoilov (born 1962), Russian-born Latvian ice-hockey player
Vitaliy Samoylov (born 1975), Ukrainian football player
Yekaterina Samoylova (1763–1830), Russian noble and lady-in-waiting
Yevgeny Samoylov (1912–2006), a Soviet actor
Yuliya Samoylova (born 1989), Russian singer
Countess Yuliya Samoylova (1803–1875)

Russian-language surnames